Ilya Shkurin (born 17 August 1999) is a Belarusian professional footballer who plays as centre-forward for Israeli club Maccabi Petah Tikva. He is also under contract with Russian club CSKA Moscow, but that contract is suspended.

Club career
In the 2019 season, he became the top scorer of the Belarusian Premier League with 19 goals scored.

On 8 January 2020, Shkurin was transferred to FC Dynamo Brest, and the next day he was re-sold by Dynamo to the Russian Premier League club PFC CSKA Moscow. He signed a 4.5-year contract with CSKA. Shkurin was handed the number 99 shirt until the end of the 2019–20 season, due to Premier League rules stipulating he couldn't use the number 11 as it had previously been used by Lucas Santos that season.

On 9 July 2021, he joined FC Dynamo Kyiv on a season-long loan.

On 27 February 2022, he was loaned to Polish Ekstraklasa side Raków Częstochowa until the end of the year. On 5 September 2022, Shkurin's loan spell with Raków Częstochowa was terminated, and he suspended his contract with CSKA Moscow for the 2022–23 season, having taken advantage of the FIFA ruling relating to the Russian invasion of Ukraine. On the same day, he joined Maccabi Petah Tikva in Israel for the 2022–23 season.

International career
Amid the 2020 Belarusian protests, Shkurin refused to play for the national team until the resignation of president Alexander Lukashenko.

Club

Honours

Individual
Belarusian Premier League top goalscorer: 2019

References

External links 
 
 
 Profile at FC Vitebsk website

1999 births
Living people
Sportspeople from Vitebsk
Belarusian footballers
Association football forwards
FC Vitebsk players
FC Energetik-BGU Minsk players
PFC CSKA Moscow players
FC Dynamo Kyiv players
Raków Częstochowa players
Maccabi Petah Tikva F.C. players
Belarusian Premier League players
Russian Premier League players
Ukrainian Premier League players
Ekstraklasa players
Liga Leumit players
Belarusian expatriate footballers
Expatriate footballers in Russia
Expatriate footballers in Ukraine
Expatriate footballers in Poland
Expatriate footballers in Israel
Belarusian expatriate sportspeople in Russia
Belarusian expatriate sportspeople in Ukraine
Belarusian expatriate sportspeople in Poland
Belarusian expatriate sportspeople in Israel